Parliamentary elections were held in Iceland on 2 and 3 December 1979. The Independence Party remained the largest party in the Lower House of the Althing, winning 14 of the 40 seats.

Results

By constituency

Notes

References

Iceland
Parliament
Elections in Iceland
Parliamentary elections in Iceland
Iceland